Incurvarites is an extinct genus of moths in the  family Incurvariidae. It was described by Rebel in 1934, and contains the species Incurvarites alienella. The fossil was found in Baltic amber and is dated to Lutetian, Middle Eocene.

References

Fossil Lepidoptera
†
Fossil taxa described in 1934
Eocene insects
Prehistoric insects of Europe
†